Ludo Delcroix (born 28 October 1950) was a Belgian professional road bicycle racer, who won the 9th stage in the 1979 Tour de France. He also competed in the team time trial at the 1972 Summer Olympics.

Major results

1972
 4th, 1972 Olympic Games – Team Time Trial
1973
 1st, Onze-Lieve-Vrouw Waver, Sint-Amandsberg & Wondelgem
 5th, Züri-Metzgete
1974
 1st, Omloop Polder-Kempen
1975
 1st, Omloop Leiedal
1976
 1st, Sinaai
1977
 1st, Circuit Franco-Belge
 1st, Stage 5, Tour de Romandie
1978
 1st, Omloop Polder-Kempen
 1st, Stage 3a, Étoile des Espoirs
 1st, Stage 2, Three Days of De Panne
 1st, Boezinge, Oostakker & Zele
1979
 1st, Stage 9, Tour de France
 1st, Berlare & Nieuwmoer
1980
 1st, Grote Prijs Jef Scherens
 1st, Stage 1, Ronde van Nederland
 1st, Boechout & Purnode
1981
 1st, Nieuwmoer
 8th, Bordeaux–Paris

References

External links 

1950 births
Living people
Belgian male cyclists
Belgian Tour de France stage winners
Cyclists at the 1972 Summer Olympics
Olympic cyclists of Belgium
Cyclists from Antwerp Province
People from Kalmthout